Some Kind of Wonderful is a 1987 American teen romantic drama film directed by Howard Deutch and starring Eric Stoltz, Mary Stuart Masterson, and Lea Thompson. It is one of several successful teen dramas written by John Hughes in the 1980s.

Plot
The film is set against the strict social hierarchy of an American public high school in the San Fernando Valley. Blue-collar mechanic and aspiring artist Keith Nelson is best friends with tomboy drummer Watts. Keith's father is obsessed with sending him to college for business, as he would be the first in their family to go.

Keith is enamored with Amanda Jones, one of the most popular girls in school, and he spends much of his time drawing her. She is dating Hardy Jenns, a spoiled and selfish boy from a wealthy neighborhood. However, Amanda herself is not wealthy: she lives in the same working-class district as Watts and Keith, and she borrows her fashionable clothes from her friends. Hardy treats Amanda as his "property" while also fooling around with another girl. Watts is dismissive of Keith's crush, saying that he and Amanda are too different. Hearing that Amanda will be in detention for the foreseeable future, Keith gets himself in trouble to spend time with her. However, Amanda talks her way out of detention, and he is stuck with the school criminals, eventually making friends with troublemaker Duncan.

When Amanda breaks up with Hardy, Keith asks her out. Mainly to spite Hardy, Amanda accepts. Meanwhile, seeing Keith with Amanda makes Watts realize that she loves him as more than just a friend. Watts pretends to like another boy to try and make Keith jealous, and she continues to discourage Keith from being with Amanda, to no avail.

Hardy plots trouble for Keith by inviting him and Amanda to a party after their date, where he plans to have Keith beaten up. Through his sister Laura, Keith finds out about the scheme and believes Amanda is a part of it. He decides to go to the party anyway and face Hardy.

Amanda's wealthy and popular friends start to shun her for being with Keith, and he tries to plan the perfect date to prove he is worthy of Amanda. With Watts in tow, he uses his college money to buy a pair of diamond earrings. Watts tells him that Amanda will appreciate a good kisser, and she kisses Keith under the guise of teaching him how to do it. Still, Keith is oblivious to Watts' attraction to him. When Keith's father discovers the college fund has been emptied, he is livid, but Keith ultimately convinces his father to respect the right to make his own decisions.

On the night of the date, Keith picks up Amanda, with Watts serving as their chauffeur. They go to an expensive restaurant for dinner, however they initially argue. Then, Keith brings Amanda to an art museum and shows her a painting he did of her. He gives her the earrings, and they kiss while Watts watches them from a distance.

Finally, they go to Hardy's party. Keith is about to get beaten by Hardy's friends when Duncan and his school buddies arrive to help him. Hardy tries to talk his way out of the predicament, exposing himself as a coward in front of the party guests. Amused, Keith tells Hardy he is "over," after which Amanda slaps Hardy.

After they leave the party, Watts apologizes to Amanda. Watts then leaves them and starts to walk home in tears. Amanda suddenly realizes that Keith and Watts have feelings for each other. She gives the earrings back to Keith and urges him to go after Watts. Keith, realizing that he is in love with his best friend, bids Amanda goodbye. He catches up to Watts, and they kiss. He then gives the earrings to a delighted Watts, who admits that she wanted them. She puts them on and asks Keith how they look, and he replies, "You look good wearing my future."

Cast
 Eric Stoltz as Keith Nelson
 Mary Stuart Masterson as Watts
 Lea Thompson as Amanda Jones
 Craig Sheffer as Hardy Jenns
 John Ashton as Cliff Nelson
 Elias Koteas as Duncan
 Molly Hagan as Shayne
 Maddie Corman as Laura Nelson
 Jane Elliot as Carol Nelson
 Candace Cameron as Cindy Nelson
 Chynna Phillips as Mia
 Scott Coffey as Ray
 Carmine Caridi as Museum Guard
 Lee Garlington as Mrs. Albright

Production
Deutch and Hughes were not happy with the ending of their previous collaboration Pretty in Pink (1986); in the script and the original cut of the film Andy (Molly Ringwald) wound up with her best friend Duckie (Jon Cryer). Test audiences disliked that ending, however, so a new ending was shot where Andy wound up with Blane (Andrew McCarthy).

With Some Kind of Wonderful, Hughes decided to re-tell the story, but with the genders of the main characters switched. Hughes named the three main protagonists—Keith, Watts, and Amanda Jones—as an inside-joke tribute to the Rolling Stones (Keith Richards, Charlie Watts, and the Stones' song "Miss Amanda Jones", respectively). Hughes wanted Ringwald to play the female lead role of Watts, but she declined in order to pursue more adult roles; she also thought the character of Amanda seemed too similar to the character she played in The Breakfast Club. Hughes took this refusal personally, and it led to the end of Hughes and Ringwald's working relationship.

Martha Coolidge was signed to direct Some Kind of Wonderful. Mary Stuart Masterson was cast as Watts. In addition to Masterson, Coolidge cast Eric Stoltz as Keith. Coolidge's vision of the film, which was darker than the eventual product, attracted Stoltz to the role.

Unhappy with Coolidge, Hughes fired her and hired Deutch to direct. Original cast members Kim Delaney (Amanda Jones) and Kyle MacLachlan (Hardy Jenns) were fired shortly after. Deutch offered Lea Thompson the role of Amanda, but she initially turned him down. However, after the Thompson-starring Howard the Duck flopped at the box office, she accepted a second offer to take the role. Deutch and Thompson started dating after filming was completed, and they got married in 1989.

The film was shot in Los Angeles in the summer of 1986. Locations include San Pedro High School, Hancock Park, and the Hollywood Bowl.

Reception
On Rotten Tomatoes the film has an approval rating of 76% based on 45 reviews, with the site's consensus: "Some Kind of Wonderful is above-average '80s teen fare for people who need as much John Hughes in their lives as possible." On Metacritic the film has a score of 55 out of 100 based on reviews from 16 critics, indicating "mixed or average reviews". Audiences surveyed by CinemaScore gave the film a grade A− on a scale of A to F.

Roger Ebert of the Chicago Sun-Times praised the film, calling it worthwhile and entertaining. Janet Maslin of The New York Times stated that Some Kind of Wonderful is the "much-improved, recycled version of the Pretty in Pink story". Richard Schickel of Time criticized the film for being unrealistic. Masterson's performance was singled out for praise by several critics.

The film grossed $18.5 million at the box office.

Soundtrack

 "Do Anything" – Pete Shelley
 "Brilliant Mind" – Furniture
 "Cry Like This" – Blue Room
 "I Go Crazy" – Flesh for Lulu
 "She Loves Me" – Stephen Duffy
 "The Hardest Walk" – The Jesus and Mary Chain
 "The Shyest Time" – The Apartments
 "Miss Amanda Jones" – The March Violets
 "Can't Help Falling in Love" – Lick the Tins
 "Turn to the Sky" – The March Violets

Charts

References

External links

 
 
 
 
 
 Some Kind of Wonderful fansite

1987 films
1987 romantic drama films
1980s American films
1980s coming-of-age drama films
1980s English-language films
1980s high school films
1980s teen drama films
1980s teen romance films
American coming-of-age drama films
American high school films
American romantic drama films
American teen drama films
American teen romance films
Coming-of-age romance films
Films directed by Howard Deutch
Films produced by John Hughes (filmmaker)
Films shot in Los Angeles
Films with screenplays by John Hughes (filmmaker)
Paramount Pictures films